Viscuso is a surname of Italian origin. It is an Italian surname derived from the Sicilian word "viscusu", which literately means "tough" or "the one who is tenacious". Notable people with the surname include:

Emanuele Viscuso (born 1952), Italian sculptor
Marivana Viscuso, Italian singer living in the United States
Sal Viscuso (born 1948), American actor